Sala Chauncey Hardy  is an indoor arena in Giurgiu, Romania. Its best known tenant is the men's basketball club CSȘ Giurgiu.

References

Sport in Giurgiu
Indoor arenas in Romania
Basketball venues in Romania